Apinac is a village and commune in the Loire department in central France. The church, dated to the 19th century, is noted for its colorful stained glass windows. Vivaro-Alpine, is the local dialect, which is also spoken in Ardèche or the Southern Alps.

History

According to the mayor of Estivareilles, in 1839, the residents of four hamlets in the commune of Apinac voted to become part of Estivareilles rather than Apinac, their reasoning being that not only had they always buried their dead in Estivareilles rather than Apinac but "since time immemorial", they had been spiritually connected with Estivareilles rather than Apinac. In 1881, it had a population of 1,120 people. In 1982, Apinac had a population of 355, with 406 reported in 2019. The principal church dates to the 19th century and is noted for its vibrant stained glass windows. Catholic worship was sanctioned to be held at the Apinac church by the Catholic Church of France.

Geography
It belongs to the Canton of Saint-Just-Saint-Rambert. The hamlets of Jossy, Combreau, Fontry, and Le Breuil are near the village of Apinac.

Climate
The climate in Apinac is temperate. The average annual temperature is however .

Demographics
In 2007, Apinac had a population of 370 people. There were 168 households, of which 56 were sole proprietorships (24 men and 32 women living alone), 60 couples without children, 44 couples with children and 8 single-parent families with children. There were 353 houses, of which 166 were the main family home, 146 were second homes, and 41 were not occupied. 323 were houses and 25 were flats. Of 166 main residences, 135 were occupied by their owners, 24 were leased and occupied by tenants, and 7 were given gratuitously.

Economy

In 2007, the population of working age consisted of 222 people; 151 were active and 71 were inactive. Of the 151 active, 141 were occupied (81 men and 60 women) and 10 were unemployed. Of the 71 inactive, 34 were retired, 15 were students, and 22 were classified as "other inactive". In 2009, the median annual income tax was €16,310 per person.

Of the 13 establishments that were in Apinac in 2007, there was one food company, six construction companies, three trade companies, one transport company, one real estate company, and one service company. As of 2009, it had three shops, including a bakery.

Attractions
A heritage building dated to 1893 is near the village. The isolated house on the highland at an elevation of  has been refurbished.

Notable people
 Philippe Bransiet (1792-1874), Superior General of the Christian Brothers.
 Jean-Claude Courveille (1787-1866), one of three founders of the Marist Brothers, lived with his maternal uncle Mathieu Beynieux, then parish priest in Apinac, who gave him Latin lessons.

See also
Communes of the Loire department

References

External links

Official site

Communes of Loire (department)
Articles which contain graphical timelines